Brantley Lake is a reservoir on the Pecos River located within Brantley Lake State Park approximately  north of Carlsbad, New Mexico off US 285.

It is impounded by Brantley Dam, completed in the 1980s as part of the Brantley Project of the United States Bureau of Reclamation.  The project's main purpose was to replace the old McMillan Dam, which had been declared unsafe. Additional benefits include irrigation, flood control, fish and wildlife enhancement, and recreation.

Brantley Lake has a  capacity assigned to flood control functions.

Brantley Lake State Park is located in the Chihuahuan Desert region of southeastern New Mexico.

Anglers can catch a variety of warm water fish such as largemouth bass, walleye, channel catfish, white bass, bluegill, and crappie.

Brantley Lake is part of the larger Brantley Wildlife area that stretches approximately  North-South in south eastern New Mexico.

References

External links
Brantley Lake State Park

Reservoirs in New Mexico
Bodies of water of Eddy County, New Mexico
Buildings and structures in Eddy County, New Mexico
Protected areas of Eddy County, New Mexico
United States Bureau of Reclamation dams
Dams in New Mexico
Dams completed in 1989